Franklin Swift Billings (May 11, 1862 – January 16, 1935) was an American businessman and politician from Woodstock, Vermont.  He served as the 54th lieutenant governor of Vermont from 1923 to 1925 and as the 60th governor of Vermont from 1925 to 1927.

Early life
Billings was born in New Bedford, Massachusetts, and his parents were Franklin Noble Billings and Nancy Swift Billings.

He was educated at Adams Academy in Quincy, and graduated from Milton Academy in Milton, Massachusetts.  Billings attended Harvard University and graduated in 1885.

Career
Billings worked on a Kansas sheep ranch and then engaged in the import-export business in New York City. In 1903 he moved to Vermont and was a director of the Woodstock Railway Company, Hotel Company, Aqueduct Company, and Electric Company. Billings was also President of the Woodstock Ice Supply Company, and Treasurer of the Empire Building Company and the Vermont Investment Company. From 1904 to 1906 he served on the staff of Governor Charles J. Bell as chief of staff of the Vermont National Guard with rank of colonel. He was the longtime chairman of the Woodstock Village Meeting and an active Republican. He was also member of the state Commissione for the Conservation of Natural Resources and the State Board of Education.

After serving in the Vermont House of Representatives from 1910 to 1913, Billings returned to the Vermont House from 1921 to 1923 and served as Speaker.

From 1923 to 1925, Billings was lieutenant governor. In 1924, he won election as governor and served from 1925 to 1927. The federal government established national forests in Vermont during his gubernatorial administration. Also, the Motor Vehicle Department was created, and provision was made for the registration of motor vehicles.

After leaving the governorship he served on the state Liquor Control Board, and was a member of the Harvard University Board of Overseers.

Personal life
On July 12, 1892, he married Elizabeth "Bessie" Hewitt Vail (1869–1917) of New York and they had three children: Elizabeth Swift Billings, Franklin Noble Billings, and Nancy Billings.

After his first wife's death in 1917, Billings then married Gertrude Freeman Curtis (1881–1964) in 1919.  They had one son; Franklin S. Billings Jr. (1922–2014), who became Chief Justice of the Vermont Supreme Court and Chief Justice of the United States District Court for the District of Vermont.

Billings "dropped dead of a heart attack in the repair shop of Joseph Carbino" in Woodstock, Vermont, on January 16, 1935. He is interred at Riverside Cemetery, Woodstock.

Legacy
Two Billings family legacies in Woodstock, the Marsh-Billings-Rockefeller National Historical Park and the Billings Farm and Museum were created to focus on conservation, rural life and agricultural history.

References

External links

The Political Graveyard

National Governors Association
Encyclopedia, Vermont Biography

Vermont National Guard personnel
School board members in Vermont
Speakers of the Vermont House of Representatives
Lieutenant Governors of Vermont
Republican Party governors of Vermont
1862 births
1935 deaths
Politicians from New Bedford, Massachusetts
Harvard University alumni
Republican Party members of the Vermont House of Representatives